Gabriel García Román (born 1973) is a Mexican-American photographer and visual artist based in New York City. He is best known for his Queer Icons, QTPoC (Queer Trans People of Color) photography series.

Biography 
Born in Zacatecas, Mexico, in 1973, García Román and his family immigrated to the United States when he was two years old. He lived with his family in the San Francisco Bay Area for three years. At the age of five they moved to North Side of Chicago where he spent his formative years. Growing up in a Mexican working-class household he was always afraid of coming out to his family and hid his sexuality. This gave him a chance to blend into the background and observe life's smaller details. At the age of twenty-six he moved to New York to reinvent himself and live life.

Education 
García Román attended City College of New York where he received a Bachelors of Arts in studio art in 2012.

Art works 
García Román weaves and integrates many styles from religious imagery to popular culture into his work to combat bias and push photography. He grew up Catholic and was influenced by the painting and murals of the saints depicted in the cathedrals. These pieces had a strong connection with García Román and saw inspiration with them. He then combined this with his beliefs in the LGBTQ community in which he states they are the modern-day saints. His inspiration and the subjects he is drawn to speak highly of the diversity he brings to this series. The Queer Icon series caught many eyes and was highlighted in many news outlets like the National Public Radio (NPR) and the Huffington Post  which sent a new wave of newfound diversity in these saint-like portraits.

Queer Icons (QTPoC)

Inspiration 
In this series you can see the inspiration from the works itself as one of the most notable aspects are the halo-like accents in most of the portraits. The form in which each person takes in looking outward in various positions, colors, and depth in which these people are portrayed further exemplifies not only the saints but the portrait styles. García Román was inspired by the portrait styles from Renaissance and Christian Orthodox painting. Some notable inspirations for Roman are Renaissance artist like Jan van Eyck, Rogier van der Weyden, and Albrecht Dürer.

Subjects 
García Román started to use friends and close acquaintances as the main focus in his art. As he entered this field, more subjects came to light through the means of social media like Tumblr and Instagram. The QTPoC community is very well connected so finding subjects was not much of a challenge. García Román asks the subjects to wear something regal and empowering to their sense of self which adds to the power of the art. His subjects are usually excluded from religious communities and yet here in his art they are depicted in a religious way that gives them the representation that is much needed.

Exhibitions

Award, grants and residencies 

 LMCC Workspace Residency – Lower Manhattan Cultural Counsel, 2019.
 NFA Artist Grant – National Association of Latino Arts & Culture, 2018
 Professional Printmaking Program, Self-Help Graphics Los Angeles CA, 2017
 Therese McCabe Ralston Connor Awards, 2008, 2009, 2010

Further reading 
 
 
 
 
 </ref>

References

External links 
 

Living people
1973 births
American artists of Mexican descent
21st-century American artists
Mexican emigrants to the United States
Artists from Zacatecas
Artists from Chicago
Artists from New York City
City College of New York alumni
Mexican LGBT artists
American LGBT artists